Tyler Cornish (born 17 October 1994) is an Australian professional rugby league footballer. He previously played for the Gold Coast Titans in the National Rugby League.

Background
Born in Goulburn, New South Wales, Cornish played his junior rugby league for the Goulburn Stockmen, before being signed by the Sydney Roosters.

Cornish is the younger brother of Sydney Roosters player Mitch Cornish.

Playing career

Early career
In 2013 and 2014, Cornish played for the Sydney Roosters' NYC team. In June 2014, he re-signed with the Roosters on a two-year contract until the end of 2016. In 2015, he graduated to their New South Wales Cup team, the Wyong Roos.

2017
In 2017, Cornish joined the Gold Coast Titans. In round 3 of the 2017 NRL season, he made his NRL debut for the Titans against the Parramatta Eels, scoring a try. In April, he moved back to Goulburn after the Titans weren't able to offer him a full-time contract for the rest of the season.

References

External links
NRL profile

1994 births
Living people
Australian rugby league players
Gold Coast Titans players
Wyong Roos players
Burleigh Bears players
Rugby league halfbacks
Rugby league five-eighths
Rugby league players from Goulburn, New South Wales